A Garda Information Message - also known as a GIM form or a GIM1 form is a green official written warning issued by Gardaí to let people know of a threat to their life. They have to be delivered by hand, accompanied by a leaflet advising how to take basic security measures.

References

See also
 Osman notice, a similar notice in the UK

Garda Síochána
Legal documents